"Firestorm" is a song recorded by Austrian singer Conchita Wurst for her debut album, Conchita (2015). It was released as an A-side single along with "Colours of Your Love" on 7 August 2015.

Live performances
The live premiere of the song was on the Lifeball 2015. Wurst performed the song on 23 May 2015 on Eurovision Song Contest 2015, and on 26 May 2015, on Euro Fan Café.

Track listing
Digital download
 "Firestorm" - 3:43
 "Colours of Your Love" – 3:34

Charts

References

2014 songs
2015 singles
Conchita Wurst songs
Eurodance songs
Songs written by Aleena Gibson
Songs written by Joacim Persson